The Republic of Afghanistan may refer to:
 Republic of Afghanistan (1973–1978)
 Democratic Republic of Afghanistan (1978–1992), known as the Republic of Afghanistan from 1987 to 1992
 Islamic Republic of Afghanistan (2004–2021)

See also 
 Emirate of Afghanistan (1823–1926)
 Emirate of Afghanistan (1929)
 Kingdom of Afghanistan (1926–1973)
 Islamic State of Afghanistan (1992–2001)
 Islamic Emirate of Afghanistan (1996–2001)
 Transitional Islamic State of Afghanistan (2002–2004)